Shine On is third live album by American heavy metal band Riot, released in 1998 in Japan by Zero Corporation and in the US by Metal Blade Records.

Track listing

Japanese release 

 In the Japanese release, track 7 "Swords and Tequila" is replaced by "Watching the Signs" and track 16 "Outlaw" by "Nightbreaker".

Personnel

Band members
Mike DiMeo - vocals
Mark Reale - guitar, producer, mixing
Mike Flyntz - guitar
Pete Perez - bass
Bobby Jarzombek - drums

Production
Paul Orofino - producer, engineer, mixing
Jeff Allen - executive producer

References

Riot V albums
1998 live albums